Streamfield, les carnets noirs is a 2010 French film directed by Jean-Luc Miesch. The film is based on the Clearstream affair.

Cast 
 Bernard Le Coq as Dominique Menacci
 Jean-Pierre Castaldi as president Massedelle
 Catherine Jacob as Judge Soren
 Élisabeth Bourgine as Liso Vega
 Marie-Sophie L. as Patricia Morlais
 Philippe Morier-Genoud as Gaspard Arthus
 Pierre Malet as Iskander Labade
 François-Éric Gendron as François Viallat
 François Marthouret as Abel Mocchi
 Pierre Arditi as the first
 Philippe du Janerand as Gilbert Kariou
 Jean-Claude Dauphin as Corbin
 Pascale Louange as Pascale
 Patrick Lambert as Charles

References

External links 

French drama films
Films scored by Philippe Sarde
2010 drama films
2010 films
2010s French films